Nieuwegein is a municipality and city in the Dutch province of Utrecht. It is bordered on the north by the city of Utrecht, the provincial capital. It is separated from Vianen to the south by the river Lek and borders on IJsselstein in the southwest and Houten in the east. Nieuwegein has 64,606 inhabitants as of 1 December 2021. 

Several national sports federations are housed in Nieuwegein, including the NeVoBo (volleyball), KNZB (swimming), NBb (basketball) and KNCB (cricket).

There are three main secondary schools in the city, including the Anna van Rijn College, Oosterlicht College and the Cals College.

History
Nieuwegein was founded on 1 July 1971 as a planned city, following the merger of the former municipalities of Jutphaas and Vreeswijk. The new town was built for the expanding population of the city of Utrecht, and grew rapidly during the decades following its foundation.

In the area between Jutphaas and Vreeswijk there used to be a settlement called Geyne (Gein). This settlement received city rights in 1295 but was destroyed in 1333, in a war between the Bishop of Utrecht and the Count of Holland. Today only Oudegein House remains from that time. After the boards of Vreeswijk and Jutphaas had debated for some time about the name of the new municipality, they decided to name it after this old settlement - Nieuwegein meaning 'New Gein'.

Population

Demographics
As of 2016, 50.7% of the population consider themselves religious. The largest denomination are Catholics, which are 27.5% of the population, followed by various protestant denominations (23.8%), and Islam (5.3%). 14.3% of the Nieuwegein population attends religious service regularly.

Social characteristics & issues
As of 2017, Nieuwegein has a poverty rate of 4.7% compared to the 5.7% national average.

Transportation
Nieuwegein is surrounded by three motorways (Dutch: autosnelweg), the A2 to the west, the A12 to the north and the A27 to the east.

Nieuwegein is connected to Utrecht and IJsselstein by the Sneltram (light rail) line. There is a pedestrian ferry across the river Lek to Vianen. Three canals flow through Nieuwegein: the Amsterdam-Rhine Canal, the Lek River and the Merwede Canal. There are also a few sports clubs in Nieuwegein, such as: KV Koveni, SV Geinoord, VSV Vreeswijk and JSV Nieuwegein.

Buildings
In Nieuwegein, there is a mandi (Mandaean temple) called Vereniging Mandi van de Mandeeërs Gemeenschap in Nederland.

Twin towns
 Puławy, Lublin Voivodeship, Poland, was a twin town of Nieuwegein from 1994 to 2020. In July 2020, after Puławy installed a gay-free zone, Nieuwegein ended the partnership.
 Rundu, Kavango East Region, Namibia, is a twin town of Nieuwegein since 1994. Because of the current state of gay rights in Namibia, the city council is debating on continuing the partnership.

Notable people 
 Piet Schrijvers (born 1946 in Jutphaas) a Dutch football manager and former goalkeeper with 563 club caps 
 Veronique Renard (born 1965) a Dutch author and visual artist
 Jasper van Dijk (born 1971 in Jutphaas) a Dutch politician
 Mark Snoeren (born 1974) a Dutch politician
 Nine Kooiman (born 1980) a Dutch politician and former social worker
 Finne Jager (born 1984) stage name Phynn, a Dutch trance and techno DJ and producer
 Manuel "Grubby" Schenkhuizen (born 1986) a Dutch professional eSports player
 Sari van Veenendaal (born 1990) a Dutch football goalkeeper with Atlético Madrid Femenino, captains the Dutch national team
 Robin de Kruijf (born 1991) a Dutch volleyball player, competed at the 2016 Summer Olympics

Gallery

References

External links

Official website

 
Municipalities of Utrecht (province)
Populated places in Utrecht (province)
Populated places established in 1971
1971 establishments in the Netherlands